Kathryn Faughey was a 56-year-old New York City psychologist who was murdered by 39-year-old David Tarloff at her Upper East Side office on the night of February 12, 2008.

Background
David Tarloff had exhibited disturbing behaviours for almost two decades, and was well known to the medical and psychiatric establishment and the police force. During these years, up to the time of the Kathryn Faughey murder, he received a wide range of psychiatric assessments and treatments.  He received medication and electroshock therapy by force.

Incident
Tarloff walked past the doorman, rolling a suitcase behind him (as seen on the building's surveillance video), saying that he was there to see Dr. Kent Schinbach, a psychiatrist from the same practice.  Tarloff waited in the office reception area, chatting with a patient, while one of Dr. Faughey's evening sessions was in progress.  After that session concluded, when he knew that Faughey was alone in her office, he entered the room and attacked her with a meat cleaver. Doctor Schinbach attempted to help her, but was seriously wounded by slashes in the face and neck.

Aftermath
Tarloff was arrested and arraigned for the murder and ordered to undergo a psychiatric evaluation which found him to be mentally competent to stand trial. There was evidence that the attack had been premeditated, but that the intended victim was Schinbach. Tarloff told police that he had planned to rob Schinbach, who he remembered being involved in diagnosing him with schizophrenia in 1991 and arranging for his institutionalization at that time. Health Insurance Portability and Accountability Act (HIPAA) regulations to protect patient confidentiality were reported to have delayed the initial investigation. Tarloff, who was expected to plead insanity in the case, was confined to a psychiatric unit of Bellevue Hospital while awaiting trial. His attorney said that "the evidence is clear that he [Tarloff] did it, but the reasons he did it ... are so crazy that we believe we have a very strong insanity defense." His trial was scheduled for October 2010, but during jury selection a mistrial was declared after two psychiatrists that the court had appointed to evaluate Tarloff found him mentally unfit to stand trial.

Tarloff went on trial for the murder in March 2013 in the State Supreme Court in Manhattan. Jury selection was completed on March 8, 2013, and opening arguments were heard on March 11. Tarloff admitted to committing the murder, but sought to avoid a prison sentence on the grounds of his mental illness. On April 16, 2013, a mistrial was declared after the jury came back a third and final time with a note that they were deadlocked.

Broader implications
The incident led to public discussion regarding the safety of mental health professionals who see patients in isolated settings. In 2006 psychiatrist Wayne Fenton, a schizophrenia researcher who was an administrator at the National Institute of Mental Health, was found dead in the home office in Bethesda, Maryland where he met with private patients, apparently murdered by a 19-year-old patient.

References

2008 murders in the United States
American murder victims
People murdered in New York City
2008 in New York City
Deaths by person in New York City
Medical controversies in the United States
Crimes in Manhattan
Violence against women in the United States
Incidents of violence against women
February 2008 events in the United States
History of women in New York City
Women in New York City